The BDC Building, 22-storey office tower (91.5 m), is the 6th tallest building in Hamilton, Ontario, Canada. Originally the building was known as the IBM Building when it first opened in 1972. The "BDC" stands for the Business Development Bank of Canada. It stands on the corners of Main Street West and MacNab Street South.

The BDC is a financial institution wholly owned by the government of Canada. BDC plays a leadership role in delivering financing and consulting services to Canadian small business, with a particular focus on technology and exporting. The BDC has 80 branches and its operating structure is divided up into 21 key market areas across the country. The BDC head office is in Montreal.

Images

See also
List of tallest buildings in Hamilton, Ontario

References

External links
Hamilton Skyscraper page- diagrams
Image #1: BDC Building

Office buildings completed in 1972
Buildings and structures in Hamilton, Ontario
Bank buildings in Canada
Modernist architecture in Canada